The Qurultay of the Crimean Tatar People is a national congress and the supreme representative plenipotentiary body of the Crimean Tatar people. Within Ukraine it is officially considered as a public organization of the Crimean Tatar National Movement.

At the Qurultay, Crimean Tatars are represented by delegates elected by Crimean Tatars regardless of their nationality, permanently residing on the territory of Ukraine as well as Crimean Tatars and members of their family who are citizens of Ukraine, regardless of their place of residence.

Credentials of Qurultay endure for five years.

Delegates represented the People's Movement of Ukraine in the Verkhovna Rada of Crimea.

Gallery

See also
 Mejlis of the Crimean Tatar People (Assembly)
 Qurultai-Rukh, a regional branch of the People's Movement of Ukraine in Crimea.

References

External links
 More information at the official website of Mejlis.

Organizations based in Crimea
Politics of Crimea
Ethnicity in politics
Politics of the Crimean Tatars